Naughty But Nice Rob (born Robert James Shuter on 16 July 1973, in Birmingham, United Kingdom) is a journalist, gossip columnist, magazine editor, talk-show host, and author.

Overview 
In 2007, Shuter became executive editor of the American edition of OK! Magazine. While Rob was an editor, OK! The magazine became the fastest-growing magazine in the US and sold its first millionth issue. During that time, OK! Also got the first exclusive interview with Britney Spears post-breakdown.

In June 2013, Shuter became a cohost of the VH1 daily morning entertainment news and gossip series, The Gossip Table.

Career

Public relations 

After graduating, Shuter started his first paid job at Bragman Nyman Cafarelli, a large Los Angeles-based public-relations firm that opened a small satellite office in New York City.

At Dan Klores Communications, he represented Jennifer Lopez during her breakup with Ben Affleck, Jessica Simpson when she split with Nick Lachey, Alicia Keys, Diddy, Jon Bon Jovi and many other crisis-management clients including Naomi Campbell and Paris Hilton.

Shuter finally decided he wanted to go out on his own, and with Jessica and Ashlee Simpson as clients, he left to start The Shuter Group.

Editing 
After representing Us Weekly magazine, Shuter approached his friend and owner of OK! Magazine, Richard Desmond, about them becoming a Shuter Group Client. Instead,  Richard suggested he close his company and come work for him as executive editor at OK!USA. With little formal experience but a great skill for knowing what celebrities were hot, he turned OK! into the fastest-growing magazine in America. Changed the focus from being celebrity friendly to celebrity fair and made sure all the exclusive wedding and baby pictures they bought would result in newsstand sales. The first was Anna Nicole’s baby girl, Dannielynn reunited with her father Larry Birkhead. Additional exclusives included Eva Longoria’s and Katherine Heigl's wedding. Plus first baby pictures of Matthew McConaughey, Jessica Alba, Sheryl Crow, plus Jamie Lynn Spears' shocking pregnancy announcement.

Under Shuter’s tenure, OK! moved from the last position in the celebrity weekly market to fifth, overtaking Life and Style in market share.  It has since sunk back to last since his departure.

Television - ‘Naughty But Nice With Rob’
After seeing Shuter on television, Mark Cuban's HDNet paid to produce a pilot with Shuter hosting his half-hour Saturday night talk show.[1] The pilot was shot at New York’s RARE Bar and Grill at the Fashion 26 Hotel in Chelsea with celebrity guest Molly Sims, Teresa from the Real Housewives of New Jersey, and the infamous Michael Lohan. The pilot got an immediate green light and production started on 3 November for a 6 November 2010 debut.

Bruce Sussman and Barry Manilow have written the theme song to the show, ‘Naughty but Nice With Rob.’ This is the second time the Grammy winners have written a theme song for a TV show; the other was ‘American Bandstand’ for Dick Clark.

Personal life 
Shuter married Grammy Award winning songwriter Bruce Sussman 29 October 2011.

References

Further reading
  
  
   
  
 

1973 births
Living people
People from Birmingham, West Midlands
Alumni of the University of Edinburgh
English LGBT entertainers
British expatriates in the United States
American public relations people
American columnists
American magazine editors
American television talk show hosts
HuffPost writers and columnists
British LGBT writers